Mike Watts is an American audio engineer, mixer, and record producer, who has worked with a variety of artists including The Dillinger Escape Plan, Glassjaw, As Cities Burn, Hopesfall, As Tall As Lions, The Dear Hunter,  and Gates. Watts has  owned and operates VuDu Studios in Long Island, New York. for past 23 years. He graduated from the Aaron Copeland School of Music, majoring in percussion and music business. Watts opened VuDu Studios in 1997 which started as a small one room facility. As his success continued, VuDu moved into a 9,000 square foot multi-room recording compound in Port Jefferson, NY.

Production Credits

References

External links
 Official website
 VuDu Studios website

Year of birth missing (living people)
Living people
Record producers from New York (state)